Doug Back (born 1954) is a Canadian media artist.

Career
Back is noted for his early contributions to the field of media art. He was a frequent artistic and academic collaborator with Canadian media artist Norman White. One of their most widely cited works together is Telephonic Arm Wrestling (1986), an arm-wrestling performance conducted between Paris and Toronto over telephone lines. Together, they were pioneers in the early teaching of physical computing at the Ontario College of Art and Design.

Awards
In 1989, Back received the Petro Canada Award for Media Arts, administered by the Canada Council for the Arts.

References

1954 births
Canadian multimedia artists
Living people
Academic staff of NSCAD University
Artists from Toronto